Scott Michael McCarron (born July 10, 1965) is an American professional golfer who was formerly a member of the PGA Tour but now plays on the PGA Tour Champions.

McCarron was born in Sacramento, California and graduated from Vintage High School in Napa, California.  He was a member of the golf team at UCLA, graduating in 1988 with a major in History. Unlike most golfers, McCarron did not transition right away from the college to the professional ranks – he gave up golf for four years (1988–1992) to work with his father in the family golf apparel business. He turned professional in 1992, and joined the PGA Tour in 1994.

McCarron won three times on the PGA Tour, with his victories coming in 1996, 1997 and 2001.

McCarron has featured in the top 20 of the Official World Golf Ranking.

McCarron was injured in the summer of 2006 and missed the entire 2007 season. He served as an analyst for The Golf Channel for its 2007 Masters coverage. He returned to the PGA Tour in 2008 and finished 108th on the money list to retain his card for 2009.

In 2010, McCarron became embroiled in controversy when he accused fellow PGA Tour player Phil Mickelson of "cheating" for using a Ping-Eye 2 wedge made before April 1, 1990 that is allowed under a legal technicality. McCarron publicly apologized to Mickelson a few days after.  30 days later, the PGA Tour and USGA banned the use of the Ping-Eye 2 wedges.

McCarron has won 11 times on the PGA Tour Champions, including one senior major, the 2017 Constellation Senior Players Championship. He made up a six-shot deficit in the final round to claim his first major by one shot.

On May 5, 2019, McCarron won the Insperity Invitational on the PGA Tour Champions for his tenth Champions tour title. The following month McCarron won the MasterCard Japan Championship by three strokes for his third win of the season.

On November 10, 2019, McCarron won the season-long Charles Schwab Cup and a $1,000,000 annuity on the PGA Tour Champions.  

On January 15, 2020, McCarron received the Jack Nicklaus Trophy as the 2019 PGA Tour Champions Player of the Year.

Professional wins (20)

PGA Tour wins (3)

PGA Tour playoff record (0–2)

Other wins (6)
1994 Long Beach Open
1997 Franklin Templeton Shark Shootout (with Bruce Lietzke)
2000 Franklin Templeton Shootout (with Brad Faxon)
2001 Franklin Templeton Shootout (with Brad Faxon)
2002 Fred Meyer Challenge (with Brian Henninger)
2016 TaylorMade Pebble Beach Invitational

PGA Tour Champions wins (11)

PGA Tour Champions playoff record (1–1)

Results in major championships

CUT = missed the halfway cut
"T" indicates a tie for a place.

Summary

Most consecutive cuts made – 5 (1996 Masters – 1997 U.S. Open)
Longest streak of top-10s – 1 (three times)

Results in The Players Championship

CUT = missed the halfway cut
"T" indicates a tie for a place

Results in World Golf Championships

QF, R16, R32, R64 = Round in which player lost in match play
"T" = Tied

Senior major championships

Wins (1)

Results timeline
Results not in chronological order before 2022.

CUT = missed the halfway cut
"T" indicates a tie for a place
NT = No tournament due to COVID-19 pandemic

See also
1994 PGA Tour Qualifying School graduates
List of golfers with most PGA Tour Champions wins

References

External links

Catching up with Scott McCarron

American male golfers
UCLA Bruins men's golfers
PGA Tour golfers
PGA Tour Champions golfers
Winners of senior major golf championships
Golfers from Sacramento, California
Golfers from Nevada
Golf writers and broadcasters
Sportspeople from Reno, Nevada
People from La Quinta, California
1965 births
Living people